The Royal Ploughing Ceremony (Vap Magula;  Phra Ratcha Phithi Charot Phra Nangkhan Raek Na Khwan), also known as The Ploughing Festival, is an ancient royal rite held in many Asian countries to mark the traditional beginning of the rice growing season. The royal ploughing ceremony, called Lehtun Mingala or Mingala Ledaw, was also practiced in pre-colonial Burma until 1885 when the monarchy was abolished

The pre-Ramayana tradition
In the various versions of Ramayana, Sita, the heroine appears from the ploughed earth as a baby when Janaka, the king of Videha ploughs the field in the royal ceremony. This is the earliest historical account of this agricultural ritual.

This tradition is a pan-Greater Indian agricultural ritual.

Southeast Asia 
The Royal Plouging Ceremony was introduced to Southeast Asia from ancient India. The ceremony appeared in ancient Indian epic Ramayana, thousand years ago.

Cambodia 
The ploughing ceremony is an ancient royal rite observed annually in Cambodia under the auspices of the king to announce the arrival of the rice-planting season and predict the crop productivity of the coming season. The ceremony is known as "ព្រះរាជពិធីច្រត់ព្រះនង្គ័ល" Preăh Réach Pĭthi Chrát Preăh Neăngkoăl, composed of Khmer (preăh: sacred or royal title, chrát: to press or to plough) and Pali-Sanskrit words.

In Cambodia, the history of the Ploughing Ceremony can be traced back to Funan period (1st-6th century) and was introduced from ancient India. The ceremony is also appeared in Reamker, the Cambodian version of Indian epic Ramayana and some other Buddhist literature.

In Angkor Borei (former capital of Funan), a statue of Balarama holding plough dated to 6th century was found. This deity statue was sculpted for the ploughing ritual and is considered to be the earliest evidence relevant to the ceremony.

The ploughing ceremony is considered to be one of the most important Khmer royal ceremonies and performs annually in Cambodia. The 2020 Cambodian Royal Ploughing Ceremony was set to be held on May 10 and is postponed as a measure to prevent the spread of Covid-19 in the kingdom.

Myanmar 

Burmese chronicles traditionally attribute the start of this rite to the late 500s CE during the Pagan dynasty, when it was performed by the kings Htuntaik, Htunpyit and Htunchit, all of whom bear the name 'htun' or 'plow.' However, this costly ritual did not occur annually nor was it performed by every monarch. During this ritual, the king plowed a specifically designated field outside the royal palace called the ledawgyi with white oxen that were adorned with golden and silver, followed by princes and ministers, who took turns to ceremonially plow the fields. While the plowing was undertaken, Brahmin priests offered prayers and offerings to the 15 Hindu deities, while a group of nat votaries and votaresses invoked the 37 chief nats (indigenous spirits). The ploughing ceremony was a ritual to propitiate the rain god, Moe Khaung Kyawzwa in order to ensure a good harvest for the kingdom, and also a way for the king to present himself as a peasant king to the commoners.

Thailand 
In Thailand, the ploughing ceremony dates back to the Sukhothai Kingdom (1238–1438). According to Quaritch Wales, a former adviser to King Rama VI and Rama VII of Siam (1924-1928), in his book Siamese State Ceremonies, the Thai adopted the Ploughing Ceremony in toto from the Khmers when they obtained the freedom from Khmer Empire upon the Independence of Sukhodaya in mid-13th century.

During John Crawfurd's Siam mission, he noted on 27 April 1822 (near the end of the reign of Rama II)This was a day of some celebrity in the Siamese calendar, being that on which the kings of Siam, in former times, were wont to hold the plough, like the Emperors of China, wither as a religious ceremony, or as an example of agricultural industry to their subjects. This rite has long fallen into disuse, and given place to one which, to say the least of it, is of less dignity... A Siamese...who had often witnessed it, gave me the following description:—A person is chosen for this occasion to represent the King. This monarch of a day is known by the name of Piya-Pun-li-teb, or King of the Husbandmen. He stands in the midst of a rice-field, on one foot only, it being incumbent on him to continue in this uneasy attitude during the time that a common peasant takes in ploughing once around him in a circle. Dropping the other foot, until the circle is completed, is looked upon as a most unlucky omen; and the penalty to the "King of the Husbandmen" is said to be not only the loss of his ephemeral dignity, but also of his permanent rank, what ever that may be, with what is more serious—the confiscation of his property. The nominal authority of this person lasts from morning to night. During the whole of this day the shops are shut; nothing is allowed to be bought or sold; and whatever is disposed of, in contravention of the interdict, is forfeited, and becomes the perquisite of the King of the Husbandmen following the ploughing. Specimens of all the principal fruits of the earth are collected together in a field, and an ox is turned loose amongst them, and the particular product which he selects to feed upon, is, on the authority of this experiment, to be considered as the scarcest fruit of the ensuing season, and therefore entitled to the especial care of the husbandman.

In Thailand, the common name of the ceremony is Raek Na Khwan (แรกนาขวัญ) which literally means the "auspicious beginning of the rice growing season". The royal ceremony is called Phra Ratcha Phithi Charot Phra Nangkhan Raek Na Khwan (พระราชพิธีจรดพระนังคัลแรกนาขวัญ) which literally means the "royal ploughing ceremony marking the auspicious beginning of the rice growing season". This Raek Na Khwan ceremony is of Hindu origin. Thailand also observes another Buddhist ceremony called Phuetcha Mongkhon (พืชมงคล) which literally means "prosperity for plantation". The royal ceremony is called Phra Ratcha Phithi Phuetcha Mongkhon (พระราชพิธีพืชมงคล). The official translation of Phuetcha Mongkhon is "Harvest Festival".

King Mongkut combined both the Buddhist and Hindu ceremonies into a single royal ceremony called Phra Ratcha Phithi Phuetcha Mongkhon Charot Phra Nangkhan Raek Na Khwan (พระราชพิธีพืชมงคลจรดพระนังคัลแรกนาขวัญ). The Buddhist part is conducted in the Grand Palace first and is followed by the Hindu part held at Sanam Luang, Bangkok.

Series 2 banknotes first issued in 1925 during the reign of Rama VI and continuing into the reign of Rama VII depicted the Royal Ploughing Ceremony on the backs of all six denominations. Rama VII discontinued the practice in the 1920s, to be revived in 1960 by Rama IX, King Bhumibol Adulyadej.

In both Cambodia and Thailand, the ceremony is typically presided over by the monarch, or an appointee. Sometimes the monarch himself has taken part in the ceremony and actually guided the plough behind the oxen.

At present, the day on which Phra Ratcha Phithi Phuetcha Mongkhon Charot Phra Nangkhan Raek Na Khwan is held is called Phuetcha Mongkhon Day (วันพืชมงคล Wan Phuetcha Mongkhon). It has been a public holiday since 1957.

In recent years in Thailand, King Vajiralongkorn has presided over the ceremony, which is held at Sanam Luang in Bangkok. Rice grown on the Chitralada Royal Villa grounds, home of the late King Bhumibol Adulyadej is sown in the ceremony, and afterward, onlookers swarm the field to gather the seed, which is believed to be auspicious.

Date

The traditional date of the Burmese royal ploughing ceremony was the beginning of the Buddhist lent in the Burmese month of Waso (June to July).

In 2009, the ceremony was held on May 11 in Thailand and on May 12 in Cambodia. In 2013, the ceremony and public holiday was held on Monday, 13 May. In Cambodia, the ceremony is mostly held on a Tuesday or Saturday.

In Thailand, the exact date and times for the yearly event are set annually by Brahman priests. Discontinued by the 1920s, this practice was revived beginning in 1960.

Rituals
In the ceremony, two sacred oxen are hitched to a wooden plough and they plough a furrow in some ceremonial ground, while rice seed is sown by court Brahmins. After the ploughing, the oxen are offered plates of food, including rice, corn, green beans, sesame, fresh-cut grass, water and rice whisky.

Depending on what the oxen eat, court astrologers and Brahmins make a prediction on whether the coming growing season will be bountiful or not. The ceremony is rooted in Brahman belief, and is held to ensure a good harvest. In the case of the Burmese royal ploughing ceremony, it may also have Buddhist associations. In traditional accounts of the Buddha's life, Prince Siddhartha, as an infant, performed his first miracle during a royal ploughing ceremony, by meditating underneath a rose apple tree, thus exemplifying his precocious nature.

Similar rite in Japan 
One of the duties of the Emperor of Japan as chief Shinto priest is the ritualistic planting of the first rice seed in a paddy on the grounds of the Tokyo Imperial Palace. He is also the one who performs the ritualistic first harvest.

See also 
 Plough Monday, traditional start of the English agricultural year
 Royal Ceremonies of the Twelve Months, historical annual ceremonies of the Thai monarchy, which include the Royal Ploughing Ceremony

Notes

References

External links

 The Royal Ploughing Ceremony
 Tourism Cambodia Highlights: Ploughing Festival

Public holidays in Cambodia
Agriculture in Cambodia
Southeast Asian culture
Public holidays in Thailand
May observances
Ceremonies in Cambodia
Ceremonies in Thailand
Public holidays in Sri Lanka
Burmese culture
Thai monarchy
Hindu festivals
Buddhist festivals